Federica De Bortoli (born November 9, 1976) is an Italian voice actress.

Biography
De Bortoli contributes to voicing characters in movies, cartoons, and anime. Among the actresses she regularly dubs includes Rachel McAdams, Natalie Portman, Isla Fisher and Kristen Stewart. She provides the voices of characters such as Darcy in the animated series Winx Club. She is also known for providing the voice of the character Bella Swan in the Italian-language version of the Twilight film series.

She works at LaBibi.it, Dubbing Brothers, Sefit - CDC and other dubbing studios in Italy. Her older sister Barbara De Bortoli is also a voice actress.

Voice work

Live Action

 Rachel McAdams in Mean Girls, Red Eye, The Family Stone, The Lucky Ones, State of Play, The Time Traveler's Wife, Sherlock Holmes, Morning Glory, Sherlock Holmes: A Game of Shadows, The Vow, To the Wonder, About Time, A Most Wanted Man, True Detective, Aloha, Southpaw, Every Thing Will Be Fine, Spotlight, Disobedience
 Natalie Portman in Heat, Star Wars: Episode I – The Phantom Menace, Star Wars: Episode II – Attack of the Clones, Garden State, Star Wars: Episode III – Revenge of the Sith, Hotel Chevalier, The Other Woman, Black Swan, Hesher, Your Highness, Knight of Cups, Jackie, Song to Song, Annihilation, Vox Lux, The Death & Life of John F. Donovan, A Tale of Love and Darkness
 Isla Fisher in Swimming Pool, Wedding Crashers, The Lookout, Hot Rod, Definitely Maybe, Confessions of a Shopaholic, Burke & Hare, Bachelorette, Now You See Me, Life of Crime, The Brothers Grimsby, Keeping Up with the Joneses, Tag
 Kristen Stewart in The Cake Eaters, Twilight, Adventureland, The Twilight Saga: New Moon, The Twilight Saga: Eclipse, The Twilight Saga: Breaking Dawn – Part 1, Snow White and the Huntsman, On the Road, The Twilight Saga: Breaking Dawn – Part 2, Sils Maria, Still Alice, American Ultra, Equals, Personal Shopper, Happiest Season
 Anne Hathaway in The Princess Diaries 2: Royal Engagement, Alice in Wonderland, Love & Other Drugs, Les Misérables, Alice Through the Looking Glass, The Hustle, The Last Thing He Wanted, Modern Love
 Kirsten Dunst in Interview with the Vampire, All I Wanna Do, The Virgin Suicides, The Crow: Salvation, Bring It On, Get Over It, The Cat's Meow, Mona Lisa Smile, Eternal Sunshine of the Spotless Mind
 Noomi Rapace in The Girl with the Dragon Tattoo, The Girl Who Played with Fire, The Girl Who Kicked the Hornets' Nest, Beyond, The Monitor, Dead Man Down, Stockholm 
 Bryce Dallas Howard in Lady in the Water, The Loss of a Teardrop Diamond, Jurassic World, Jurassic World: Fallen Kingdom, Rocketman
 Cobie Smulders in The Avengers, Captain America: The Winter Soldier, Avengers: Age of Ultron, Jack Reacher, Avengers: Infinity War, Spider-Man: Far From Home, Tru Calling, Agents of S.H.I.E.L.D., Stumptown 
Keira Knightley in Star Wars: Episode I – The Phantom Menace, A Dangerous Method, The Nutcracker and the Four Realms, Official Secrets 
 Reese Witherspoon in Pleasantville, Election, This Means War, Wild, Inherent Vice, Hot Pursuit
Gemma Arterton in The Disappearance of Alice Creed, Prince of Persia: The Sands of Time, Song for Marion, Gemma Bovery, Their Finest
Tara Reid in American Pie, Just Visiting, American Pie 2, Devil's Pond, American Reunion
Abbie Cornish in A Good Year, W.E., Seven Psychopaths, Premonition, Where Hands Touch
 Amy Adams in The Wedding Date, The Fighter, Her
 Emilie de Ravin in Santa's Slay, Lost, The Hills Have Eyes, Remember Me
 Mélanie Laurent in Paris, Inglourious Basterds, Le Concert
Greta Gerwig in Greenberg, To Rome with Love, Frances Ha
Evan Rachel Wood in Little Secrets

Anime and animation
 Kagome Higurashi in InuYasha (Season 1)
 Kagome Higurashi in Inuyasha: The Final Act
 Darcy in Winx Club
 Darcy in Winx Club 3D: Magical Adventure
 Tails in Sonic X
 Lexi Bunny in Loonatics Unleashed
 Agura Idaben in Hot Wheels Battle Force 5
 Saturn Girl in Legion of Super Heroes
 Suki in Avatar: The Last Airbender
 Lu in Mike, Lu & Og
 Harue Kudou in Gals!
 Ducky in The Land Before Time
 Ducky in The Land Before Time II: The Great Valley Adventure
 Nene Romanova in Bubblegum Crisis
 Ginger Foutley in As Told by Ginger
 Silvermist in Tinker Bell
 Silvermist in Tinker Bell and the Lost Treasure
 Silvermist in Tinker Bell and the Great Fairy Rescue
 Kurumi Kasuga in Kimagure Orange Road
 Tomoko Saeki in DNA²
 Fuuka Tanigawa in Dai-Guard
 Roberta Tubbs in The Cleveland Show
 Lina Inverse in Slayers (2nd dub)
 Midori Fujiyama (Second voice) in Gaiking
 Miho in Saint Seiya: The Movie (2nd dub)
 Karen Tehama in Fillmore!
 Hahli in Bionicle: Mask of Light
 Sage and Ginger in Blue's Clues
 Candy in Dave the Barbarian
 Nana Komatsu in Nana
 Kestrel (2nd voice) in The Animals of Farthing Wood
 Junko Miyaji in FLCL
 Miaka Yūki in Fushigi Yûgi
 Matilda in LeapFrog
 Molly Baker in Sailor Moon (Viz Media redub)
 Lal'C Mellk Mal in Diebuster
 Sailor Moon/Usagi Tsukino in Sailor Moon R: The Movie
 Portia in Friends and Heroes
 Yukari in Saikano
 Mune-Mune in Magical Shopping Arcade Abenobashi
 Priscilla in Gunslinger Girl
 Jelly Otter in PB&J Otter
 Padmé Amidala in Star Wars: Clone Wars (2003 TV series)
 Padmé Amidala in Star Wars: The Clone Wars (film)
 Padmé Amidala in Star Wars: The Clone Wars (2008 TV series)
 Yukino Miyazawa in Kare Kano
 Cheza in Wolf's Rain
 Betty Brant in The Spectacular Spider-Man
 Kyoko Tokiwa in Full Metal Panic!
 Kyoko Tokiwa in Full Metal Panic? Fumoffu
 Kyoko Tokiwa in Full Metal Panic!: The Second Raid
 Lirin in Saiyuki
 Masami in Generator Gawl
 Alielle Relryle in El-Hazard
 Felicia in Night Warriors: Darkstalkers' Revenge
 Diana in Pokémon 4Ever
 Margaret Tim in Dinosaur Island
 Olivia Flaversham in The Great Mouse Detective
 Sarah Whitney in Horseland
 Hikari Horaki in Neon Genesis Evangelion
 Urara Kasuga in Sakura Diaries
 Mei Mer in KO Beast
 Alice Smashenburn in Game Over (TV series)
 T-Ai in Transformers: Robots in Disguise
 Yuko Miyabe in Strange Dawn
 Arisu Mizuki Serial Experiments Lain
 Flapper in Dink, the Little Dinosaur
 Kilowatt in Space Chimps
 Stacey in A Goofy Movie
 Little Lulu in The Little Lulu Show
 Cynthia Brisby in The Secret of NIMH
 Tsujiwaki Miki in Hungry Heart: Wild Striker
 Aika Sumeragi in Agent Aika
 Himeno Awayuki in Prétear
 Yukari Uchida in The Vision of Escaflowne
 Pai Chan in Virtua Fighter
 Excel in Excel Saga
 Paprika in Paprika
 Sae Sawanoguchi in Magic User's Club
 Cleao Everlasting in Sorcerous Stabber Orphen
 Potato Chip in Popples
 Yurika Misumaru in Martian Successor Nadesico
 Nurse Jenny in ChalkZone
 Rapunzel in Sofia The First
 Rapunzel in Rapunzel's Tangled Adventure
 Rapunzel in Ralph Breaks the Internet

References

External links
 
 
 

1976 births
Living people
Actresses from Rome
Italian voice actresses